Théophile Bidard de la Noë (11 March 1804 – 23 October 1877) was a French politician and law professor, although he might be most remembered as the employer and principal witness for the prosecution against serial killer Hélène Jégado in 1851.

Bidard was born in Rennes in 1804. He sat in the Constituent Assembly from 1848 to 1849 as a moderate republican and in the National Assembly from 1871 to 1876 as a member of the Orléanist parliamentary group, Centre droit.

He served as Mayor of Rennes.

References 

1804 births
1877 deaths
Moderate Republicans (France)
Orléanists
Members of the 1848 Constituent Assembly
Members of the National Assembly (1871)
Crime witnesses
Mayors of Rennes
Academic staff of the University of Rennes
Chevaliers of the Légion d'honneur